Hojir is an Iranian hero in Shahnameh, the national epic of Iran. Hojir is son of Goudarz and brother of Giv and Rohham. Hojir first appears in the story of Rostam and Sohrab.

Hojir in the Shahnameh
He is castellan of Dez-e Sepid (White fortress) in the border of Iran and Turan. When Sohrab arrives at Dez-e Sepid, Hojir came out to fight him, but he was defeated by Sohrab, however Sohrab does not kill Hojir and instead takes him as a prisoner. Sohrab, wishing to recognize Rostam, his father, asks Hojir to introduce leaders of Iranian army to him, but when he asks about Rostam, Hojir does not reveal Rustam's identity, fearing that Sohrab may kill Rostam.

Hojir then participated in a series of battles between Iran and Turan, sometimes as a messenger. His most important role is in the story of Davazdah Rokh (Twelve combats), where he kills Sepahram, a Turanian hero in a pitched battle.

Other resources
Beside Shahnameh, Hojir was also mentioned in other sources such as Momjalal-tawāriḵ, where he is the chief companion of Kay Khosrow.

His name is derived from Old Iranian *Hu-čiθra and it means "of good nature" or literally of good appearance. In Middle Persian texts, his name was mentioned as hu-čihr and then it developed into New Persian Hožir/Hojir, meaning "beautiful, fair". َIts cognate in Modern Persian is Hu-čehr (هوچهر) or beh-čehr (بهچهر). It sometimes incorrectly pronounced as "Hajir".

Family tree

References

Sources
Ferdowsi Shahnameh. From the Moscow version. Mohammed Publishing.

External links 

Shahnameh characters
Shahnameh stories